The 2020 Queensland Cup season was to be the 25th season of Queensland's top-level statewide rugby league competition run by the Queensland Rugby League. On 27 March, the competition, known as the Intrust Super Cup due to sponsorship from Intrust Super, was cancelled after one round due to the COVID-19 pandemic. It was the first time the competition would not be played out since its inaugural season in 1996.

Teams
In 2020, the lineup of teams remained unchanged for the sixth consecutive year. On 13 December 2019, the Newcastle Knights formed a partnership with the Ipswich Jets but did not send players to the club. The cancelled 2020 season was the final year that the Brisbane Broncos and Redcliffe Dolphins were affiliated, having partnered since 2006. The Dolphins entered a partnership with the New Zealand Warriors for the 2021 season.

Cancellation
On 17 March, two days after the completion of Round One, the Queensland Rugby League (QRL) announced a 10-week suspension of the competition until 5 June, due to the COVID-19 pandemic. On 27 March, ten days after the suspension, the QRL confirmed the cancellation of the competition for the 2020 season. QRL managing director Robert Moore stated, “by making this announcement now, it provides our clubs with the opportunity to re-set and turn their attention towards the 2021 season."

Ladder

See also

 Queensland Cup
 Queensland Rugby League

References

2020 in Australian rugby league
Queensland Cup
Sports events curtailed due to the COVID-19 pandemic